SOGEPA (Societé de Gestion de Participations Aéronautiques) is a French holding company owned completely by the French Republic. It is one of the largest public bodies investing in European aerospace technology, indirectly owning 11.11% shares of Airbus as at 31 December 2016.

It was under supervision of Agence des participations de l'État.

In 2014, SOGEPA became one of the major shareholders of PSA Peugeot Citroën (now Stellantis).

References

Holding companies of France